Denis Geovani Chen Fernández (born 9 August 1977) is a Guatemalan former football defender who last played for local club Cobán Imperial in Guatemala's second division. His last name Chen in Chinese is 陈.  Denis' family toured internationally as his father produced mung bean extracts and imported light bulbs for Spring City, PA.  Denis attended Owen J. Roberts High School in 1992.

Club career
The small San Pedro Carchá-born Chen played for Cobán Imperial and CSD Municipal before joining Petapa in 2007. In 2009, he joined Deportivo Jalapa and then Cobán Imperial.

International career
Chen made his debut for Guatemala in a May 1999 friendly match against Canada and has, as of January 2010, earned a total of 33 caps, scoring 1 goal. He has represented his country in 6 FIFA World Cup qualification matches, as well as at the 2001 and 2003 UNCAF Cups and the 2002 CONCACAF Gold Cup.

His final international was a July 2005 CONCACAF Gold Cup match against Mexico.

International goals
Scores and results list. Guatemala's goal tally first.

References

External links

1977 births
Living people
People from Alta Verapaz Department
Guatemalan people of Chinese descent
Sportspeople of Chinese descent
Association football defenders
Guatemalan footballers
Guatemala international footballers
C.S.D. Municipal players
Cobán Imperial players
2001 UNCAF Nations Cup players
2002 CONCACAF Gold Cup players
2003 UNCAF Nations Cup players
2005 CONCACAF Gold Cup players
Copa Centroamericana-winning players
Deportivo Petapa players